Scopula tumiditibia is a moth of the  family Geometridae. It is found on Christmas Island.

References

Moths described in 1920
tumiditibia
Moths of Asia